Ali Muhammad Idris (born January 1, 1992) is a Nigerian comedian and film editor. He acts in many Hausa movies and he is also known as Ali Artwork.

Early life and education
Ali Artwork was admitted at Sa’adatu Rimi College of Education Kumbotso, Kano to Study Languages (English/Hausa), he dropped out after his first year due to financial issues.

Ali Artwork is married to Hauwa.

Awards and nominations
Ali Artwork was nominated in MTN Kannywood award 2016 as best editor (Movie: Gwaska). He was also nominated for AMMA AWARD as Best Movie Trailer editor 2016 Award. Merit Award by Arewa Creative Industry Kaduna State of Nigeria.

Selected filmography
 Ɗan Marayan Zaki
 Gwaska
 Birnin Masoya
 Maja
 Ga Fili Ga Mai Doki
 Duniya Makaranta
 Soyayya Da Shaƙuwa
 Bayan Rai, Raddi
 Ashabul Kahfi
 Birnin Masoya
 mayene ni
 sai na auri Zara buhari
 Maɗagwal
 Kayan lefen Zara Buhari
 Baƙon Amerika
 Ali artwork almajiri
 kwamandan hisba
 Alhaji ya dawo
 Ɗan maula
 sai na zama gaye
 Ƙauraye
 Baban soyayya
 bansan tsoro
 Ɓarayin zaune
 Ƙanjamau
 Kansilan kauye
 Matar police
 wasan banza
 Kidnapper

References

Nigerian male film actors
Living people
People from Kano
Male actors in Hausa cinema
21st-century Nigerian male actors
Kannywood actors
Nigerian comedians
1992 births
Hausa people
Nigerian film editors